Koiak 2 - Coptic Calendar - Koiak 4

The third day of the Coptic month of Koiak, the fourth month of the Coptic year. On a common year, this day corresponds to November 29, of the Julian Calendar, and December 12, of the Gregorian Calendar. This day falls in the Coptic season of Peret, the season of emergence. This day falls in the Nativity Fast.

Commemorations

Saints 

 The martyrdom of Saint Pistavros, the New Martyr

Other commemorations 

 The entrance of Saint Mary into the Temple at Jerusalem

References 

Days of the Coptic calendar